The Last Time is a studio album by Australian singer John Farnham. The album was released in Australia on 7 October 2002 and reached No. 1 in the ARIA charts with triple platinum status. The album featured three singles, including "No Ordinary World", "Keep Talking" and the title song "The Last Time".

The Last Time album (CD and digital download)
 "The Last Time" (Mick Jagger, Keith Richards) – 3:31
 "No Ordinary World" (Lars Anderson, Stephen Allen Davis) – 3:50
 "Lonely Man" (Simon Ellis, Wayne Hector) – 4:48
 "When I Can't Have You" (Winston Sela) – 4:15
 "Undeniably Real" (Keith Beauvais, Shaun Escoffery, Keith Murrell) – 3:30
 "Keep Talking" (David Munday, Phil Thornalley) – 3:14
 "Sometimes" (Steve Romig) – 4:09
 "One More Try" (Andrew Gibbs) – 3:34
 "Even After All This Time" (Andrew Gibbs) – 4:07
 "Eternally" (James Roche, Melinda Schneider) – 3:44
On 21 July 2003, a DVD of the concert tour The Last Time Live, was released with Farnham performing tracks from the album, plus numerous hits and well known songs from previous Aria winning albums Whispering Jack, Age of Reason, Chain Reaction and Romeo's Heart

The Last Time concert live: DVD track listing
Part 1: Acoustic
 "A Simple Life [Live]" (J. Lind, R. Page) – 4:28
 "Raindrops Keep Falling on My Head [Live]" (B. Bacharach, H. David) – 8:01
 "A Touch Of Paradise [Live]" (R. Wilson, G. Smith) – 7:44
 "Burn For You [Live]" (P. Buckle, J. Farnham, R. Faser) – 9:09
 "Talk of the Town [Live]" (S. Howard) – 4:07
 "Two Strong Hearts [Live]" (B. Woolley, A. Hill) – 3:21
 "Chain Reaction [Live]" (D. Stewart, S. Stewart) – 3:47

Part 2: Electric
 "Reasons [Live]" (S. See) – 5:17
 "No Ordinary World [Live]" (L. Andersson, S. Davis) – 4:02
 "Hearts On Fire [Live]" (T. Kimmel, S. Lynch) – 7:53
 "When The War Is Over [Live]" (S. Prestwich) – 5:24
 "Age Of Reason [Live]" (T. Hunter, J. Pigott) – 10:34
 "Keep Talking [Live]" (P. Thornalley, D. Munday) – 3:16
 "Man of the Hour [Live]" (S. Hostin, D. Deviller, S. Kipner) – 5:09
 "One [Live]" (H. Nilsson) – 3:47
 "Everytime You Cry [Live]" (S. Peiken, G. Sutton) – 6:13
 "Please Don't Ask Me [Live]" (G. Goble) – 6:35
 "Help! [Live]" (J. Lennon, P. McCartney) – 7:46
 "That's Freedom [Live]" (T. Kimmel, J. Chapman) – 4:53
 "Pressure Down [Live]" (H. Bogdanovs) – 3:35
 "Playing to Win [Live]" (G. Goble, J. Farnham, D. Hirschfelder, S. Housden, S. Proffer, W. Nelson, S. Prestwich) – 3:07
 "You're the Voice [Live]" (M. Ryder, C. Thompson, A. Qunta, K. Reid) – 8:10
 "Sadie (The Cleaning Lady) [Live]" (Gilmore, Madara) – 2:15
 "The Last Time [Live]" (M. Jagger, K. Richards) – 6:57
Part 3
 "Credits"  – 3:14
Part 4
 "Under The Big Top"  – 27:21

Personnel
Musicians 
John Farnham – vocals
Chong Lim – keyboards, arrangements
Angus Burchall – drums
Craig Newman – bass
Stuart Fraser – guitars
Lindsay Field – vocals
Lisa Edwards – vocals
The Victorian Philharmonic Orchestra – strings
Technical staff

 Michael Costa – mastering

Charts

Weekly charts

Year-end charts

Certifications

References 

2002 albums
ARIA Award-winning albums
John Farnham albums